The Mali cobra (Naja katiensis), also called the Katian spitting cobra or West African brown spitting cobra, is a species of spitting cobra found in West Africa.

{Venom}
"This species has venom that it spits towards its opponents. The venom consists of postsynaptic neurotoxins and cardiotoxins that cause cytotoxic activity." 
(“Western African Spitting Cobra.” Branson's Wild World, http://bransonswildworld.com/western-african-spitting-cobra/. )

Geographic Distribution 
This species ranges from Senegal to Cameroon, with recorded sightings in Gambia, Guinea-Bissau, far northern Guinea, Southern Mali, Ivory Coast, Burkina Faso, Northern Ghana, Togo, Southwestern Niger and Nigeria.

Habitat 
This species occurs in both tropical and subtropical grasslands, savannas, and shrublands.

References

Mali cobra
Snakes of Africa
Reptiles of West Africa
Mali cobra